Bidorpitia gomphifera is a species of moth of the family Tortricidae. It is found in Cotopaxi Province, Ecuador.

The wingspan is about 25 mm. The ground colour of the forewings is pale cinnamon, sprinkled and strigulated (finely streaked) with dark cinnamon. The markings are brownish. The hindwings are cream, but pale dirty orange posteriorly.

Etymology
The species name refers to the shape of the uncus and is derived from Latin gomphus (meaning plug) and fero (meaning carry).

References

Moths described in 2008
Euliini
Moths of South America
Taxa named by Józef Razowski